Loyalty is the fifth studio album by American rapper Fat Joe. The album was released on November 12, 2002, by Terror Squad and Atlantic Records The album debuted at number 31 on the US Billboard 200 chart. Take A Look At My Life was featured in the 2004 video game  Def Jam: Fight For NY, which featured Fat Joe as a playable character.

Critical reception

A writer for RapReviews gave praise to the production quality throughout the track listing, singling out Cool & Dre for their contributions that showcase their talents, and Joe for delivering on his lyrical content with hard-edged, introspective street bangers and romantic rap ballads despite getting a "little too commercial for his own good" in the middle portion of the album, concluding that "When all things are considered, Fat Joe did a nice job of balancing this album for different crowds and fanbases, if not a great job of doing so like he did on Don Cartagena and J.O.S.E.." HipHopDX staff writer Mikeo said, "Fat Joe's Loyalty isn't anything more than average in the end. The hodge-podge of grimy, ghetto inspired tracks and commercially acceptable songs leave this album in staccato. Overall, as a product it's easy to recommend to the radio hungry Hip Hop fan, it's just that [Fat] Joe is not going to be remembered for the time he put into this release."

Track listing

Charts

References

2002 albums
Fat Joe albums
Atlantic Records albums
Albums produced by Irv Gotti
Albums produced by Chink Santana
Albums produced by Cool & Dre
Albums produced by the Alchemist (musician)
Albums produced by Buckwild
Albums produced by Ron Browz